X-Men: Second Coming is a crossover storyline published by Marvel Comics that runs through most of the X-Men comic books from March to July 2010.

Publication history
Second Coming is the final part of a trilogy of stories that began with "Messiah Complex" and continued in "Messiah War."  Intended as a conclusion to Cable's efforts to save Hope from Bishop, who has hunted the so-called Mutant Messiah since her birth, the series also builds on the "Utopia", "Nation X" and "Necrosha" storylines of 2009 in the X-Men books.

The story center's on the return of Cable and Hope Summers to the present day and Bastion's final campaign to destroy the X-Men.

Plot synopsis
The story follows the return of Cable and Hope from the future to the present. Their arrival sparks action from Bastion and his allies Stephen Lang, Bolivar Trask, William Stryker, Graydon Creed and Cameron Hodge. Bastion tells them that the Mutant Messiah has returned and gives them orders to kill her.

When a firefight breaks out between Cable, Hope and the Purifiers, Wolverine and the others arrive to help. As the Alpha Team (Wolverine, X-23, Angel, Colossus, Nightcrawler, Psylocke and Magik) battle Stryker and his Purifiers, Magik makes her way toward Hope under orders from Wolverine to teleport her to Utopia. One of the Purifiers opens a portal to Limbo that Magik cannot control and she is drawn into it by a cluster of demonic tentacles. The Purifiers also incapacitate Nightcrawler with disorienting weaponry to prevent him from teleporting. Wolverine's team find Cable and Hope and after a short confrontation with another group of Sapien League members, the X-Men and Cable decide on a diversionary tactic. Cable remains behind with some of the X-Men after learning from the New Mutants that Cable was being tracked, while Rogue, Nightcrawler and Hope leave in order to protect the girl.

In parallel, the New Mutants arrive at Cameron Hodge's facility. Cameron Hodge impales Karma's leg in the battle, leading to an eventual amputation. However, the mutants are victorious when Hodge's whole army of "Smileys" are killed by Warlock at the behest of Cypher. Warlock forcibly absorbs their life forces via their shared connection with the techno-organic Transmode virus.  The New Mutants warn Cyclops of Bastion's towers.

In a missile strike, Ariel is killed. Bastion targets the X-Men's teleporter's. Shortly afterwards, Cyclops loses contact with the Alpha and Beta teams. The Alpha Team has been attacked by armoured soldiers and in response, Psylocke telekinetically sends X-23 to the jet to commandeer it. Nightcrawler, Rogue, and Hope arrive in Nevada where Bastion appears before them and brutally beats Rogue. Just as Bastion extends his arm to kill Hope, Nightcrawler teleports between them and is impaled in the chest. Nightcrawler teleports Hope to Utopia where he tells her that he believes in her before he dies. When the Alpha Team returns to Utopia, Colossus wants Pixie to rescue Magik from Limbo. In Nevada Bastion repairs himself and tells his followers to prepare for Plan B. As evening falls, Nightcrawler's funeral is held with Beast arriving to place blame on Cyclops' shoulders.

Three and a half miles away from San Francisco, the X-Club investigate an oil rig and discover a ticking timer.  Suddenly it explodes and Cyclops is certain that the X-Men's jets, the Blackbirds, have been decimated. Donald Pierce is found standing amid the debris and rues that he will not live to witness the decimation of the mutant race. Cyclops eliminates him with an optic blast and alerts the X-Men to expect an attack. With no teleporters, no planes, and no Cerebra, Cyclops announces that they are trapped on Utopia. Meanwhile, the X-Club Science team are caught in a trap of their own as they recover from the oil rig explosion. Through a conversation between Dr. Nemesis and the others it is revealed that they are stranded just outside San Francisco and Utopia.

Suddenly an offshore explosion rocks Utopia, sending the X-Men reeling. When the X-Men gather near the Bay they find a massive dome of energy enveloping both San Francisco and Utopia. The X-Men quickly attempt to destroy the dome but to no avail. Namor appears and informs Cyclops that the energy dome also descends into the ocean floor making it in actuality a sphere. At the ruins of the oil rig the X-Club attempts to analyze and dispose of the sphere. After a detailed scientific explanation provided by Madison Jeffries, the X-Club find themselves face to face with the Avengers who are responding to the loss of San Francisco off the grid. Thor's efforts to bring down the sphere from the outside also prove futile, despite his persistence. In San Francisco Magma, Namor and Cyclops survey the damage caused by the sphere via jetpacks, meeting at the Golden Gate Bridge. At the bridge they observe a smaller silver sphere and conclude that it is powering the dome. The X-Men arrive. Under Cyclops's orders Iceman attacks the silver sphere only to be choked by a big metal arm. The other X-Men watch in horror as a legion of Nimrod type Sentinels begin to emerge.

With an army of Nimrod model sentinels’ continuing to emerge from Bastion's time portal, a massive battle between the X-Men, their allies and Bastion's forces ensues. The X-Men emerge from this battle victorious but with several X-Men severely injured. Cyclops orders the strongest members of the X-Men to guard the portal while the injured are quickly ferried back to Utopia. Bastion tells his minions that the host of Nimrod sentinels faced by the X-Men was only a scouting party.

On Utopia, Cyclops gathers the core X-Men and briefs everyone on the state of things following the battle. Next Beast explains that Bastion's portal is powered by an unknown energy source and made from an unknown origin. Beast also notes that the portal is temporal in nature connecting them to another period in history. Prodigy of the New X-Men team scans the portal again and discovers that there are at least 170,000 Sentinels waiting on the other side. Cyclops begins to formulate a new strategy which hinges on Cable using his last time jump to take X-force to the future to deactivate the sentinels. The revelation of the previously secret X-force team causes dismay among the X-Men who were unaware that the team existed or was murdering potential threats to mutants. Cyclops then sends all battle worthy mutants to the portal and tells them to prepare for another attack. The Stepford Cuckoos inform Cyclops that another wave of Sentinels are arriving. Colossus, Namor, Rockslide and Dust get ready to fight. Cable initiates the jump and X-Force leaves this timeline.

The X-Men then engage the Nimrods in battles all around the city and on Utopia. A Nimrod approaches Utopia and breaches its outer wall. Cyclops quickly shuts down several levels of the complex except for those most crucial and the resulting explosion from doing so destroys the Nimrod.  Within the city Storm, Surge, Iceman, Psylocke and Fantomex manage to destroy several Nimrods between them through coordinated efforts, while at the Port of Oakland Namor fights several more by himself but calls in for assistance as five more suddenly appear. Though at low power after a recent coma Magneto defends the island against a horde of Nimrods to buy Beast time to treat the wounded.

In the future, X-force fights it way into a sentinel Processing Centre where Cypher takes over the programming of Master Mold and they shut down all of the Nimrods in both the present and future. Their mission completed X-Force retrieves Cable and Cypher and makes their way to the time portal to escape back to the present. Unfortunately, in the ensuing chaos X-23 is brutally burned when she attempts to cross through the time portal. The members of X-Force come to the conclusion that only inorganic matter is able to pass through the portal. With no other alternative Cable sacrifices himself to hold the portal open and allow the others to return home.

Back in the present as all of the Nimrods have suddenly shut down, the X-Men are seen staring in shock and attempting to understand what has happened. Outside of the dome Bastion appears with the reanimated Graydon Creed and Stephen Lang commenting that while the Nimrods are gone, mutantkind is still trapped and that he will deal with the remaining mutants himself. After witnessing Cable's sacrifice Hope manifests various X-Men powers such as Armor's psionic armor and Colossus's organic steel and kills Lang and Creed. With the assistance of the X-Men she eradicates Bastion and shatters the dome surrounding the city. At a celebratory bonfire Emma notices the flames around Hope take the shape of the Phoenix, and this triggers a flashback to the Sisterhood storyline where Jean freed her from Lady Mastermind's illusion, and told her to "prepare". Seized with terror Emma runs to Cyclops to warn him.  However, before she can Cyclops tells her that Cerebra has found five new mutants (Transonic, Velocidad, Oya, Primal, and Zero) that have appeared around the globe.

Tie-ins and one-shots

As part of the cross-over, a number of tie-in mini-series and one-shots were released.

Revelations: X-Factor
Written by Peter David and drawn by Valentine De Landro, this story arc, starting with issue #204, features the reanimated leader of the Mutant Response Division, Bolivar Trask, as he tries to kill every member of X-Factor.

Revelations: Hellbound
Written by Chris Yost and drawn by Harvey Tolibao and Sandu Florea, the three issue mini-series features Magik being banished to Limbo by a weaponised spell where she is conspired against by an old enemy. Cannonball leads a team which includes Northstar, Trance, Dazzler, Gambit, Pixie, and Anole on a mission to rescue her.

Revelations: Blind Science
Written by Simon Spurrier and drawn by Paul Davidson and Francis Portela, this one-shot features members of the X-Club trying to unravel a trap set by Bastion.

Aftermath
After leaving the X-Men due to Cyclops' more militant style of leadership, Beast heads to L.A. to meet up with his girlfriend Abigail Brand who stands him up, only to meet up with Molly Hayes of the Runaways. The two discuss extinction, faith, and living life to its fullest.

Hope is at the Baxter Building with Dr. Nemesis and Rogue, receiving a physical from Mr. Fantastic, as well as conversing with his son Franklin Richards. Upon giving Hope a clean bill of health, Reed suggests that Hope try to locate her family in an attempt to learn more about who she really is. On the way back to Utopia, Hope insists on doing just that.

Cyclops takes some time off to go hunting in the Savage Land, during which he encounters Steve Rogers, who suggests that Cyclops bring the X-Men out of the shadows and into the light as heroes. Rogers arranges to have the President award Scott the Presidential Medal of Freedom, which sways the people of San Francisco to welcome the X-Men back.

During a celebration on Utopia, Cyclops sneaks away to talk to Hope, in an attempt to discuss a strategy of dealing with the five lights. Hope becomes agitated at his expectations and just wants to find her family. Scott, realizing his mistreatment of Hope, decides that he'll deal with the lights and send a team to escort Hope to Alaska, much to her delight.

The storyline span-off a new ongoing series, Generation Hope that focuses on the five lights.

Reading order
The comic books involved include issues of New Mutants, Uncanny X-Men, X-Force and X-Men: Legacy with cover dates starting in April 2010 as well as a two-shot titled X-Men: Second Coming published by Marvel Comics, released in March 2010.

March 2010
 Chapter 1: X-Men: Second Coming #1

April 2010
 Chapter 2: Uncanny X-Men #523
 Chapter 3: New Mutants #12
 Chapter 4: X-Men: Legacy #235
 Chapter 5: X-Force #26

May 2010
 Chapter 6: Uncanny X-Men #524
 Chapter 7: New Mutants #13
 Chapter 8: X-Men: Legacy #236
 Chapter 9: X-Force #27

June 2010
 Chapter 10: Uncanny X-Men #525
 Chapter 11: New Mutants #14
 Chapter 12: X-Men: Legacy #237

July 2010
 Chapter 13: X-Force #28
 Chapter 14: X-Men: Second Coming #2

Additional books

February 2010
 Prologue: X-Men: Second Coming Prepare

April 2010
 Cable #25 (renamed Deadpool and Cable #25)- released with chapter 2
 X-Men: Second Coming - Revelations: X-Factor #204 - released with chapter 4

May 2010
 X-Men: Second Coming - Revelations: Hellbound #1 - released with chapter 6
 X-Men: Second Coming - Revelations: X-Factor #205 - released with chapter 8
 X-Men: Second Coming - Revelations: Blind Science #1 - released with chapter 9

June 2010
 X-Men: Second Coming - Revelations: Hellbound #2 - released with chapter 10
 X-Men: Second Coming - Revelations: X-Factor #206 - released with chapter 12

July 2010
 X-Men: Second Coming - Revelations: Hellbound #3 - released with chapter 14
 Uncanny X-Men: The Heroic Age - released with chapter 14
 X-Men Phoenix Force Handbook #1

Collected editions
The comic books are being collected into single volumes:

X-Men: Second Coming (collects Second Coming: Prepare, X-Men: Second Coming #1-2, Uncanny X-Men #523-525, New Mutants #12-14, X-Men: Legacy #235-237 and X-Force #26-28, 472 pages, hardcover, October 2010)
X-Men: Second Coming Revelations (collects X-Men: Hope, X-Men: Blind Science, X-Men: Hellbound #1-3 and X-Factor 204–206, 200 pages)

References

External links

Second Coming
Comics by Matt Fraction
New Mutants
Marvel Comics titles
Mutants in fiction
X-Men supporting characters
X-Men titles